Wolfgang Otto Völz (16 August 1930 – 2 May 2018) was a German actor. He is known for his roles in theatre plays, TV shows, feature films (especially German films based on Edgar Wallace works) and taped radio shows. He was also a very prolific voice actor.

Völz studied acting and consequently worked as a stage actor. After more than ten years of acting including a great deal of supporting roles in feature films and TV shows he became a popular cast member ("Lt. Mario de Monti") of Space Patrol – The Fantastic Adventures of the Spaceship Orion.  He continued being successful on the TV screen by playing Ioan (German: Johann), the driver and bodyguard of Graf Yoster (and afterwards many other characters).

As a voice actor he dubbed American stars such as Walter Matthau, Peter Falk and Mel Brooks and people or animals in animated films like Impy's Island.

Selected filmography
  Paths in Twilight (1948)
 Fruit in the Neighbour's Garden (1956)
 The Fox of Paris (1957)
 The Girl Without Pyjamas (1957)
 Man in the River (1958)
 Carnival Confession (1960)
 The Last of Mrs. Cheyney (1961)
 My Husband, the Economic Miracle (1961)
 Street of Temptation (1962)
 The Lightship (1963)
 Murderer in the Fog (1964)
 Emil and the Detectives (1964)
 Raumpatrouille – Die phantastischen Abenteuer des Raumschiffes Orion (1966, TV series, 7 episodes)
 Graf Yoster (1967–1976, TV series, 62 episodes)
  (1968, TV miniseries)
 Der Kommissar: Das Messer im Geldschrank (1969, TV series episode)
 Der Kommissar: Ende eines Humoristen (1972, TV series episode)
 Der Kommissar: Drei Brüder (1974, TV series episode)
 Sonderdezernat K1: Hafenhyänen (1974, TV series episode)
 Auch ich war nur ein mittelmäßiger Schüler (1974)
 Tatort: Kassensturz (1976, TV series episode)
 Wolffs Revier: Notwehr (1992, TV series episode)
  (1994)
 Tatort: Falsches Alibi (1995, TV series episode)
 The Einstein of Sex (1999)
  (2001, TV film)
 Der Wixxer (2004)
 Impy's Island (2006, voice)
 Neues vom Wixxer (2007)
 Mord ist mein Geschäft, Liebling (2009)

Further reading 
Ralph Keim: Benjamin und Wolfgang Völz – Eine Biografie, SWB Verlag, Stuttgart, August 2010,

References

External links 

 Wolfgang Völz as voice actor

1930 births
2018 deaths
Male actors from Gdańsk
German male stage actors
German male film actors
German male television actors
German male voice actors
20th-century German male actors
21st-century German male actors
Recipients of the Cross of the Order of Merit of the Federal Republic of Germany
Recipients of the Order of Merit of Berlin
Naturalized citizens of Germany
People from the Free City of Danzig